John Fearn may refer to:
 John Fearn (whaler) (fl. 1798), English whaling ship captain who was the first European to travel to Nauru
 John Fearn (philosopher) (1768–1837), British philosopher and retired Royal Navy officer
 John Walker Fearn (1832–1899), American diplomat
 John Russell Fearn (1908–1960), British writer

See also
Sir John Ferne (c. 1560–1609), English knight, writer on heraldry, genealogist, and lawyer